Yi Yuong (born 1937) is a former Cambodian cyclist. He competed in the team time trial at the 1964 Summer Olympics.

References

External links
 

1937 births
Living people
Cambodian male cyclists
Olympic cyclists of Cambodia
Cyclists at the 1964 Summer Olympics
Place of birth missing (living people)